Hugh Connolly may refer to:
 Hugh Connolly (footballer), Irish footballer  
 Hugh Connolly (priest) (born 1961), Irish priest